Isabelle Vasseur (born 10 April 1959) is a former member of the National Assembly of France.  She represented Aisne's 5th constituency from 2007 to 2012, as a member of the Union for a Popular Movement (UMP).

She was elected on 17 June  2007 to the thirteenth legislature (2007–2012) in the 5th district of l'Aisne by beating, in the second round, Dominique Jordain with 53.96% of the votes. She succeeded Daniel Gard the previous deputy (UMP), who was the substitute candidate for Renaud Dutreil in the 2002 election.

She was vice president of the UMP in the National Assembly.

External links
 Official page on the National Assembly web site
 Le Monde of 12 and 19 June 2007
 Her homepage

References

1959 births
Living people
Union for a Popular Movement politicians
Women members of the National Assembly (France)
Deputies of the 13th National Assembly of the French Fifth Republic
21st-century French women politicians